The 1898–99 Irish Cup was the nineteenth edition of the premier knock-out cup competition in Irish football. 

Linfield won the tournament for the sixth time and second year in a row, defeating Glentoran 1–0 in the final.

Results

First round
Teams from Belfast, Dublin and the north west of Ireland were given byes in the first two rounds while several Army teams were selected to play in the first two rounds.

|}

Second round

|}

Third round

|}

Replays

|}

Second replay

|}

Fourth round

|}

Replays

|}

Fifth round

|}

Semi-finals

|}

Replay

|}

1 Another replay was ordered after a protest.

Second replay

|}

Final

2 The match ended early after Glentoran players refused to continue claiming that a Linfield player had punched a shot clear from the goal-line and no penalty had been awarded.

References

External links
 Northern Ireland Cup Finals. Rec.Sport.Soccer Statistics Foundation (RSSSF)

Irish Cup seasons
1898–99 domestic association football cups
1898–99 in Irish association football